Hannelore Roedel (born 3 July 1957) is a German politician from the Christian Social Union of Bavaria. She was a member of the German Bundestag from 2002 and 2005.

References

1957 births
Living people
Politicians from Nuremberg
Members of the Bundestag for Bavaria
Members of the Bundestag 2002–2005
Female members of the Bundestag
21st-century German women politicians
Members of the Bundestag for the Christian Social Union in Bavaria